Notre Dame High School is a private, Roman Catholic high school in Clarksburg, West Virginia.  It is part of the Roman Catholic Diocese of Wheeling-Charleston.

Background
Notre Dame traces it roots to St. Joseph Academy, an all-girls school founded in 1866. St. Mary's opened in 1914 as a boys' preparatory school. In 1928, both schools consolidated.  St. Mary's became a grade school in 1955 and Notre Dame High School opened its doors that same year.

Academics
Notre Dame currently offers over 10 Advanced Placement courses. It has a 100% graduation rate with 98% pursuing higher education. Dr. Carroll Kelly Morrison has been the principal for fourteen years.  Before that Carroll was a cheerleading coach, guidance counselor, and originally, a math teacher.

Athletics
Former West Virginia University player Jarrod West is the current high school boys' basketball coach. They compete in the Single A division of West Virginia High School athletics.

Famous alumni
Frank Loria, college football player at Virginia Tech

Athletics
Football
Golf
Soccer
Cheerleading
Basketball
Swimming
Tennis
Baseball
Softball
Track and Field

External links
  District Website

Notes and references

Roman Catholic Diocese of Wheeling-Charleston
Private middle schools in West Virginia
Catholic secondary schools in West Virginia
Schools in Harrison County, West Virginia
Educational institutions established in 1866
1866 establishments in West Virginia
Buildings and structures in Clarksburg, West Virginia